Warren, previously called Little Lakes, is a hamlet located east of Richfield Springs, on US 20 in Herkimer County, New York, United States. The hamlet is in the town of Warren.

References

Hamlets in Herkimer County, New York
Hamlets in New York (state)